Chung is a surname whose bearers are generally people of Chinese or Korean descent. It is also a Vietnamese surname worn by people of Chinese descent but is very rare in Vietnam; the surname is known as Zhong (trad/simp: 鍾/锺) in Mandarin Chinese, Jong (鍾/종), Jong (宗/종), and Jung (鄭/정) in Korean, and Chung in Vietnam, Taiwan and Hong Kong.

 Chung or Zhong (surname),  is a transliteration of several Chinese surnames, including Zhōng (鍾/锺 or 钟), Zhòng (种, mistakenly for Chóng, cf. :zh:种姓) and Zhòng (仲), etc.. These are transliterated as Chung (especially in Taiwan, Hong Kong and Malaysia). Sometimes it's transliterated as Cheong or Choong in Malaysia.
Sometimes,  is also spelled as Cheung instead of Chiang/Jiang due to its Cantonese pronunciation.
 Jeong (Korean surname), a Latin alphabet rendition of the Korean family name "정" (hanja: 鄭, 丁, 程), sometimes also spelled as Chung, Jung, or Jong.

Notable people with the surname include:

Chung Chung-hoon (born 1970), South Korean cinematographer and filmmaker
Chung Dong-kee (born 1949), South Korean volleyball player
Chung Eui-sun (born 1970), South Korean businessman
Chung Eui-yong (born 1946), South Korean diplomat and politician
Chung Hong-won (born 1944), South Korean politician and prosecutor
Chung Hwang-keun (born 1961), South Korean politician
Chung Hyeon (born 1996), South Korean tennis player
Chung Il-kwon (1917–1994), South Korean politician, diplomat and soldier
Chung Jung-yong (born 1969), South Korean football manager and former player
Chung Ju-yung (1915–2001), South Korean businessman
Chung Kai-lai (1917–2009), Chinese–American mathematician and academic
Chung Mong-hong (born 1965), Taiwanese film director, screenwriter and cinematographer
Chung Mong-hun (1948–2003), South Korean businessman
Chung Mong-joon (born 1951), South Korean businessman and politician
Chung Mong-koo (born 1938), South Korean businessman
Chung Sye-kyun (born 1950), South Korean politician
Chung Thye Phin (1879–1935), Malaysian farmer and businessman
Chung Yong-jin (born 1968), South Korean businessman
Chung Yoo-ra (born 1996), South Korean equestrian
Chung Yung-chi (born 1957), Taiwanese weightlifter
Alexa Chung (born 1983), British writer, television presenter, model and fashion designer
Arthur Chung (1918–2008), Guyanese politician and judge, first President of Guyana
Betty Chung (born 1947), Hong Kong singer and actress
Cecilia Chung (born 1965), Hong Kong LGBT rights activist
Charlet Chung (born 1983), American actress
Cherie Chung (born 1960), Hong Kong actress
Chi Hyun Chung (born 1970), South Korean–Bolivian doctor, evangelical pastor and politician
Chipo Chung (born 1977), Zimbabwean actress and activist
Christopher Chung (politician) (born 1957), Hong Kong politician
Christopher Chung (actor) (born 1988), Australian actor and singer
Christopher Chung (footballer) (born 1998), Hong Kong footballer
Christy Chung (born 1970), Canadian actress
Clara Chung (born 1987), American singer and songwriter
Connie Chung (born 1946), American journalist
David Chung (disambiguation), multiple people
Deborah Chung (born 1952), Chinese–American materials scientist and academic
Doo-Ri Chung (born 1973), American fashion designer
Doreen Chung (c. 1932–2009), Guyanese public figure and wife of Arthur Chung
Eugene Chung (born 1969), American football player
Fan Chung (born 1949), Taiwanese–American mathematician and academic
Fay Chung (born 1941), Zimbabwean politician and educator
Foy Gordon Chung (born 1975), Fijian swimmer
Geoffrey Chung (1950–1995), Jamaican musician and record producer
Iris Chung (born 1987), Hong Kong model and actress
Jamie Chung (born 1983), American actress
Kadin Chung (born 1998), Canadian soccer player
Koo Chung, American singer and songwriter
Kyung Wha Chung (born 1948), South Korean violinist
Lee Isaac Chung (born 1978), American film director and screenwriter
Lily Chung (born 1969), Hong Kong actress
Linda Chung (born 1984), Canadian actress, singer and songwriter
Margaret Chung (actress) (born 1976), Canadian model, actress and yoga instructor
Mikey Chung (born 1954), Jamaican musician and record producer
Myung-wha Chung (born 1944), South Korean cellist
Myung-whun Chung (born 1953), South Korean conductor and pianist
Nicole Chung (born 1981), American writer and editor
Patrick Chung (born 1987), American football player
Paul Chung (1959–1989), Hong Kong actor and disc jockey
Peter Chung (born 1961), South Korean–American animator
Rebecca Chan Chung (1920–2011), Chinese–Canadian nurse and educator who served with the Flying Tigers and the US Army during World War II
Roy Chung (1957–2004), Korean–American US Army soldier and defector to North Korea
Sammy Chung (1932–2022), English footballer and manager
Stella Chung (born 1981), Malaysian actress and singer
Sun Hwan Chung (born 1940), South Korean–American Tang Soo Do, Hapkido and Taekwondo grandmaster
Tiffany Chung (born 1969), Vietnamese–American artist
Wallace Chung (born 1974), Hong Kong actor
Wonho Chung (born 1980), Jordanian comedian